Gisele Bennett was a professor at the Georgia Institute of Technology and the Director of the GTRI Electro-Optical Systems Laboratory at the Georgia Tech Research Institute (GTRI). She also founded the Logistics and Maintenance Applied Research Center (LandMARC) at GTRI.

Education
Bennett holds a 1987 B.S. and a 1989 M.S. from the College of Optics and Photonics at the University of Central Florida and a 1995 Ph.D. from the Georgia Institute of Technology, all in electrical engineering.

Career
After earning her Ph.D., Bennett began working at GTRI as a research scientist in 1996 and as a professor in the Georgia Tech School of Electrical and Computer Engineering in 1997. In 2000, she founded the Logistics and Maintenance Applied Research Center (LandMARC) and is currently its director. Bennett became the director of the GTRI Electro-Optical Systems Laboratory in 2005. In 2014, she was named an Optical Society of America fellow for 2015.

Bennett is a member of the Army Science Board. She is a Fellow in The Optical Society (OSA) and International Society for Optics and Photonics (SPIE) and a Senior Member of the Institute of Electrical and Electronics Engineers (IEEE). She has held officer positions in OSA and IEEE and serves in a variety of professional activities involving optical engineering research. She has been a topical editor and has served as a feature editor for Applied Optics and is a visiting lecturer for SPIE and OSA.

Bennett has served as a research proposal reviewer for the National Institute of Health and National Science Foundation and a reviewer for numerous referred journals. She is one of the first 10 Fellows chosen for Georgia Tech’s University Leadership program. In 2017, she won the Progress and Service Award for Sustained Impact in Administration from the Georgia Tech Research Corporation.

In January 2021, she became Editor-in-Chief of Applied Optics.

Awards and honors

 2015, Fellow, The Optical Society - For technical innovation in the use of optical imaging and for research leadership.
2015, Fellow, International Society for Optics and Photonics (SPIE)

References

Living people
Georgia Tech Research Institute people
Georgia Tech faculty
Georgia Tech alumni
University of Central Florida alumni
Florida Institute of Technology faculty
Year of birth missing (living people)
Women in optics